Goli Chas (also Romanized as Golī Chās, Golīchās, and Golī Chās) is a village in Zaz-e Sharqi Rural District, Zaz va Mahru District, Aligudarz County, Lorestan Province, Iran. At the 2006 census, its population was 235, in 46 families.

References 

Towns and villages in Aligudarz County